London Town is the sixth studio album by the British–American rock group Wings. It was released in March 1978, two years after its predecessor, Wings at the Speed of Sound. The album had a long and tumultuous gestation during which the band's tour plans for 1977 were cancelled, due to Linda McCartney becoming pregnant with her and Paul McCartney's third child and two members of Wings having departed, leaving the band as a trio comprising Paul, Linda and Denny Laine. Recording sessions were held intermittently over a period of a year, mainly at Abbey Road Studios in London and aboard a luxury yacht in the Virgin Islands.

London Town charted in the top five positions in the UK and the US. It failed to repeat the success of Wings' three previous albums, however, and received mostly unfavourable reviews from music critics. The lead single, "With a Little Luck", was a number 1 hit in the US, but the album's subsequent singles achieved only minor chart success. Also recorded during the sessions was the 1977 non-album single "Mull of Kintyre", which, until 1984, was the best-selling single in UK chart history.

History
After the commercial success of 1976, with Wings at the Speed of Sound and the well received Wings Over the World tour, Wings' leader Paul McCartney planned on making 1977 a similar year. In February, Wings began recording sessions at Abbey Road Studios, which continued until the end of March. Wings recorded five songs there: "Girls' School", "Name and Address", "London Town", "Children, Children" and Linda McCartney's "B-Side to Seaside". The last was issued as the flip-side of the single "Seaside Woman" (issued under the name "Suzy and the Red Stripes"). The initial plan that Wings would tour in the US once more was thwarted by Linda's discovery that she was pregnant with her and Paul's third child. With the knowledge that they were not going to tour and had time at their disposal – and once again looking for different locales to record in – Wings found themselves moored on a yacht called Fair Carol in the Virgin Islands during the month of May where several new songs were recorded. Reflecting the nautical locale, the album's working title was Water Wings. As Linda's pregnancy progressed, the band halted the sessions for the album, except for the recording of a new track called "Mull of Kintyre" that August and the completion of the already begun "Girls' School". The two songs were released as a single in late 1977 – Wings' only new release that year.

Before the single's release came two defections from Wings: drummer Joe English had become homesick for America and returned home, and lead guitarist Jimmy McCulloch left Wings to join the Small Faces that September. For the first time since 1973's Band on the Run, Wings were down to the core three of Paul, Linda and Denny Laine, as reflected on the picture sleeve of the single.

In November, two months after the birth of the McCartneys' son James, and shortly after sessions for London Town resumed, the Scottish tribute "Mull of Kintyre" was released to enormous commercial success. The song became the UK's biggest-selling single, outstripping the Beatles' largest seller "She Loves You". Although it would be topped in 1984 by Band Aid's "Do They Know It's Christmas?", "Mull of Kintyre" still ranks as the UK's fourth biggest-selling single and the largest selling non-charity single.

Recording for London Town was completed with some final overdubbing in January 1978. The single "With a Little Luck" was released on 31 March and became a number 1 hit in the US. The album also features the song "Girlfriend", which American pop star Michael Jackson subsequently covered on his 1979 album Off the Wall.

In 1993, London Town was remastered and reissued on CD as part of the Paul McCartney Collection series. "Mull of Kintyre" and "Girls School" were added as bonus tracks. Laine included versions of "Children Children" and "Deliver Your Children" on his 1996 album Wings at the Sound of Denny Laine.

Reception

London Town received generally unfavourable reviews from music critics. In the charts, it peaked at number 4 in the UK and number 2 in the US, where it sold over one million copies and went platinum. After a strong start initially, however, it lacked the staying power of Wings' previous releases. The album's follow-up singles, "I've Had Enough" and the title track, became relatively minor hits. The album marked the end of Wings' commercial peak and the beginning of a minor commercial slump for McCartney.
 
Paul McCartney was reportedly displeased with Capitol Records in the US, where "Mull of Kintyre" was ignored by radio programmers; its B-side, "Girls School", reached only number 33 on the US charts. He was further dismayed at what he viewed as Capitol's lacklustre promotion for London Town. With his contract at an end, he signed up with Columbia Records for North America (remaining with EMI elsewhere in the world) and would stay there until 1984, before returning to Capitol in the US.

The album was certified platinum in Australia on the day of its release.

Track listing
All songs written by Paul McCartney, except where noted.

Side one
"London Town" (Paul McCartney, Denny Laine) – 4:10
"Cafe on the Left Bank" – 3:25
"I'm Carrying" – 2:44
"Backwards Traveller" – 1:07
"Cuff Link" – 2:03
"Children Children" (McCartney, Laine) – 2:20
"Girlfriend" – 4:31
"I've Had Enough" – 3:02

Side two
"With a Little Luck" – 5:45
"Famous Groupies" – 3:34
"Deliver Your Children" (McCartney, Laine) – 4:17
"Name and Address" – 3:07
"Don't Let It Bring You Down" (McCartney, Laine) – 4:34
"Morse Moose and the Grey Goose" (McCartney, Laine) – 6:27

Additional tracks on 1993 CD reissue
"Girls' School" – 4:38
"Mull of Kintyre" (McCartney, Laine) – 4:42

Personnel
Paul McCartney – lead vocals, guitars, bass, keyboards, drums, percussion, violin, flageolet, recorder, Gizmotron
Denny Laine – vocal (lead vocals on "Children Children" and "Deliver Your Children"), guitars, bass, flageolet, recorder, percussion
Linda McCartney – vocal, keyboards, percussion
Jimmy McCulloch – guitars, bass, percussion
Joe English – vocal, drums, percussion, harmonica

Charts

Weekly charts

Year-end charts

Certifications and sales

References

External links

1978 albums
Albums produced by Paul McCartney
Albums with cover art by Hipgnosis
Capitol Records albums
Parlophone albums
Paul McCartney and Wings albums